This article gives the single and digital track sales achieved by alumni of American Idol.  The songs listed here however include only songs released in their post-Idol career, and does not include coronation songs, live or studio recordings released during the season or straight after the finale, or songs from American Idol season compilation CD.  (See American Idol Hot 100 singles for a list of those songs.)

Total digital track sales
These are the total digital download figures in the US for individual Idol alums.  Physical single sales, which totaled 4,798,000 units, are not included in this table.

 As totaled from entries listed in this page and American Idol Hot 100 singles
 Totalled from entries listed but also including album tracks not listed here or in American Idol Hot 100 singles
 Including new single releases and extra sales since January 14, 2014.
 Including new single releases and extra sales since January 21, 2012.

Top songs
This is a list of songs that have charted on Billboard Hot 100 but does not include songs released during or soon after the final episode of American Idol of each contestant's season. Where a song has been certified gold but easily verifiable sales information is not available, the sales figure is provisionally assumed to be 500,000 or 100,000 as the case may be.  The numbers may include physical single sales figures, however, it is rare for songs to be released as physical singles after 2006.  A few songs were not released for sale and charted based on radio play only.

Note that the best-selling song by an American Idol alumnus is Phillip Phillips' "Home" which, being a coronation song, is listed in List of American Idol Hot 100 singles.  Its sales stand at 5,400,000 as of December 2015.

The table is ranked in term of sales, but can be sorted other ways by clicking on the  icon.

The numbers for Kelly Clarkson's "Stronger (What Doesn't Kill You)", "Mr Know It All", and "Catch My Breath" include sales of different versions of those songs. Sales numbers for other versions of "Mr Know It All", "Stronger (What Doesn't Kill You)", and "Catch My Breath"  are 49,000, 35,000, and 45,000, respectively.  "Because of You" does not include the duet with Reba McEntire and it has sold 621,000 copies.
This figure is for physical single of The Way/Solitaire. Digital download of The Way is 36,000.
Gold certification for digital sale was only 100,000 before July 2006 (Clay Aiken's Invisible was certified gold in March 2006).
No physical singles were available for Josh Gracin.
This is the rounded combined total of last known sales figures of the live charity single and the album version of David Cook's Permanent.  The charity single sold 61,000 as of June 3, 2009, and the album version sold 142,354 as of May 29, 2011.
Sales number for first week on chart only.

Uncharted songs
This is a list of some of the other more notable releases with sales information but did not chart on Billboard Hot 100.  It is not intended to be a comprehensive list of all singles released by American Idol alums.

References

External links 
Idol Chatter

American Idol